General Chamberlain may refer to:

Crawford Chamberlain (1821–1902), British Indian Army general
John Loomis Chamberlain (1858–1948), U.S. Army major general
Joshua Chamberlain (1828–1914), Union Army brigadier general and brevet major general
Neville Bowles Chamberlain (1820–1902), British Indian Army general
Paul A. Chamberlain (fl. 2010s–2020s), U.S. Army major general

See also
William Chamberlaine (1871–1925), U.S. Army brigadier general
Harry Chamberlin (1887–1944), U.S. Army brigadier general
Stephen J. Chamberlin (1889–1971), U.S. Army lieutenant general
Attorney General Chamberlain (disambiguation)